Your Place or Mine! is a 1998 Hong Kong romantic sex-comedy film written and directed by James Yuen and produced by Wong Jing.

Plot 
Cheung is an advertising executive who has had many relationships, often with the talent that he employed. However, they all invariably leave him, the act referred to as "flying away". One day, he becomes captivated with Ah-yu, an unknown talent, at a photoshoot. After she signs with Cheung's agency, they begin seeing each other. Concurrently, Cheung begins to get closer to his stern new boss Vivian, whom he finds out is actually dating a married man. As Ah-yu's career takes off, Cheung agrees to sign her off to a different management agency so that she can expand her career in Japan. Cheung asks his father on whether he has been involved with two women at once, to which he replies that the secret is that "according to regulation football rules, you can not allow two footballs on the field at the same time." Later, Vivian ends her affair and almost hooks up with Cheung at his apartment. However, Ah-yu unexpectedly returns, confused about being sent to Japan, only to find Cheung and Vivian together. Both women leave as it cuts to his father giving him metaphorical red card. On the day of Ah-yu's departure, Cheung struggles to decide between both women. He decides to go to the airport and choose there only to be stopped by Vivian. She gives Cheung an ultimatum of marriage but Cheung declines the offer. At that moment, he realizes that having to do the "flying away" is just as heartbreaking as having to receive it. Cheung reunites with Ah-yu at the airport and offers to fly together with her to Japan.

In the epilogue, Cheung is back in Hong Kong as Ah-yu continues to become more popular in Japan. He receives a phone call in French as he insinuates to his father that he's actually a bigger fan of snooker.

Cast 

 Tony Leung Chiu-wai  as Cheung Suk-Wai — an advertising agency executive who consistently falls in love with his clients but gets dumped once they become popular
 Vivian Hsu as Ah yu — the cheery new model at the agency and Leung's new love interest
 Ada Choi as Vivian — Wai's new strict boss whom everyone thinks is a lesbian
 Alex Fong as Patrick — Wai's philandering co-worker and friend
 Suki Kwan as Mei — Patrick's co-worker, longtime friend, and newfound love interest
Eileen Tung as Patrick's Shanghainese girlfriend
Spencer Lam as Wai's father

Production 
The film was shot in 15 days.

Release 
Hong Kong received a blu-ray and DVD release by CN Entertainment on 24 March 2021.

Reception 
Derek Elley for Far East Film Festival likened the film's qualities to productions by the defunct production company United Filmmakers Organization. James Yuen had written several of Peter Chan's films about relationships for the company, such as He's a Woman, She's a Man (1994).

Awards and nominations

References

External links 

 
 

Hong Kong romantic comedy films
1998 romantic comedy films
Hong Kong sex comedy films
1990s sex comedy films
1990s Hong Kong films